José María Sanz Beltrán, Loquillo or Loco (born 21 December 1960) is a Spanish rock singer. He was born in Barcelona.
Beginning in the 1980s, he performed as Teddy Loquillo, and then with the groups Loquillo y los Intocables, and later Loquillo y Los Trogloditas. He started out as a rockabilly artist, and then became more famous mixing pop, punk and rock. He played as a solo act as well as performing with the Trogloditas, but they broke up in 2008. Nowadays, he's a widely recognised solo artist in Spain. He also writes blogs on elmundo.es.

Discography Loquillo y los Intocables
1980- Los tiempos están cambiando, Cúspide
1981- Rock and Roll Star (single), Cúspide
1981- Esto no es Hawaii (single), Cúspide
1982- Autopista (single)

Discography Loquillo y Los Trogloditas
Studio and Live Albums:
1983- El ritmo del garaje, Tres Cipreses
1984- ¿Dónde estabas tú en el 77?, DRO/Tres Cipreses
1985- La Mafia del Baile, Hispavox
1987- Mis problemas con las mujeres, Hispavox
1988- Morir en Primavera, Hispavox
1989- ¡A por ellos...! que son pocos y cobardes (doble directo), Hispavox
1991- Hombres, Hispavox
1993- Mientras respiremos, Hispavox
1996- Tiempos asesinos, Hispavox
1997- Compañeros de viaje (doble directo), EMI-Hispavox
2000- Cuero Español, EMI music Spain-Odeón
2001- Feo, fuerte y formal, Konga Music/Blanco y Negro
2004- Arte y ensayo, DRO East West
2006- Hermanos de Sangre (doble directo + DVD), DRO Atlantic

Reeditions
2001- El ritmo del garage (remastered, sold as a disc/book), DRO East West/3 Cipreses
2005- ¡A por ellos...! que son pocos y cobardes (remastered with a DVD), EMI-Hispavox
2007- Compañeros de viaje (remastered with a DVD), EMI-Hispavox

Compilations
1987- Loquillo & Sabino 1981-1984 , DRO/Tres Cipreses
1993- Héroes de los 80 , DRO
1997- Simplemente lo mejor, Hispavox
1998- 1978-1998, Hispavox
2002- Historia de una actitud * 25 años de Rock & Roll* (+ DVD), EMI-Hispavox
2007- The Platinum Collection, EMI-ODEON

Discography Loquillo
With Gabriel Sopeña:
1994- La vida por delante, EMI-Hispavox
1998- Con elegancia, PICAP
2005- Mujeres en pie de guerra (banda sonora original del documental homónimo), DRO Atlantic

Solo
1999: Nueve tragos, Zanfonia
2008: Balmoral
2016: Viento del este
2016: Salud y Rock and Roll
2022: Diario de Una Tregua No.5 Spain

Others
1981- Loquillo y sus amigos (Los tiempos están cambiando), Cuspide - Reedita Hispavox
2000- Loquras (rarities), EMI-Hispavox
2007- Nueve tragos (remastered reedition), DRO Atlantic

References

External links
Loquillo official web

Singers from Barcelona
Spanish male singers
Living people
1961 births
Rock en Español musicians